S.H.E is a Taiwanese girl group. Their discography consists of eleven studio albums, three live albums, two compilation albums, seven soundtrack albums and one Internet album. All of S.H.E's album covers display an oxalis as a symbol for the group. On some covers, the clover is easy to spot (Girls Dorm, Together, Encore, Forever) while its appearance is more subtle on others (Super Star, Once Upon a Time). Album releases are followed with the release of a karaoke VCD, consisting of the group's music videos for that particular album.

Although S.H.E does not write the majority of their songs, they composed "Sweet Honey". The rights to the song were sold on 21 October 2005, for NT$200,000. In 2007, S.H.E produced the song "Wifey" for Play.

Albums

Studio albums

Digital albums

Live albums

Compilation albums

Extended plays

Singles

Soundtracks

Collaborations

Other songs
"Let Yourself Shine" (讓自己亮起來) - jingle for 3+2 cracker commercials.
"Always Open" - for 7-11's 2007 promotional campaign.
"7 Kids" (7仔) - for Stephen Chow's movie CJ7. Although it is S.H.E's only Cantonese song, "7 Kids" was later re-sung in Mandarin.
"Red Throughout The World" (紅遍全球) - Coca-Cola's theme song for the 2008 Beijing Olympics. The initial version also featured Will Pan and Jacky Cheung, but an S.H.E-only version was later released.
"S.H.E's Pop Radio 91.7 台歌" - jingle for FM 91.7.
"Dream Field" (夢田 Meng Tian) -  S.H.E's 2009 bonus single album on "The 3 Spas of Love (爱的3温暖)".

Footnotes

 Featuring Selina in a solo or collaboration
 Featuring Hebe in a solo or collaboration
 Featuring Ella in a solo or collaboration

References

Discography
Discographies of Taiwanese artists
Pop music group discographies
Mandopop discographies